The 195th New York State Legislature, consisting of the New York State Senate and the New York State Assembly, met from January 8, 2003, to December 31, 2004, during the ninth and tenth years of George Pataki's governorship, in Albany.

State Senate

Senators
The asterisk (*) denotes members of the previous Legislature who continued in office as members of this Legislature. Betty Little and Joseph Robach changed from the Assembly to the Senate at the beginning of this legislature.

Note: For brevity, the chairmanships omit the words "...the Committee on (the)..."

Employees
 Secretary:

Assembly members
The asterisk (*) denotes members of the previous Legislature who continued in office as members of this Legislature.

Note: For brevity, the chairmanships omit the words "...the Committee on (the)..."

Employees
 Clerk: ?

References

Sources
 Senate election results at NYS Board of Elections
 Assembly election results at NYS Board of Elections

195
2003 politics in New York (state)
2004 politics in New York (state)
2003 U.S. legislative sessions
2004 U.S. legislative sessions